Estate or The Estate may refer to:

Law
 Estate (law), a term in common law for a person's property, entitlements and obligations
 Estates of the realm, a broad social category in the histories of certain countries.
 The Estates, representative bodies of the estates of the realm
 Estates General, a supra-regional gathering of representatives of the estates of the realm
 Estate in land
 Estate (land), the grounds and tenancies (such as farms, housing, woodland, parkland) associated with a very large property
 Housing estate, a group of houses built as a single development.
 Industrial estate (office park) and trading estate; property planned and sub-let for industrial and commercial use.
 Real estate or real property
Estate agent or real estate agent
 Literary estate, the intellectual property of a deceased author, or the executor thereof

Automobiles and technology
 Estate car (station wagon), a passenger car with a full-size interior cargo compartment
 Buick Estate, a luxury station wagon offered by General Motors from 1940 until 1990
 Estate, a brand of major appliances, first from RCA, afterwards from Whirlpool Corporation

Books
The Estate (Isaac Bashevis Singer novel)
The Estate play by Oladipo Agboluaje

Film and TV
 Estate (2020 film), a short film
 Estate (2022 film), an Indian Tamil-language horror drama film
 The Estate (2020 film), film with Eric Roberts, directed by James Kapner
 The Estate (2022 film), a dark comedy film
 The Estate (TV series), BBC documentary
 The Estate, 2011 film with Brian Murphy
 The Estate, a 2021 drama series on SABC 3

Music
 Estate (album), a jazz piano album by Michel Petrucciani
 "Estate" (song), a 1960 Italian song and jazz standard, sung by Milva, written by	Brighetti, Bruno Martino

Other
Estate Khmaladze (born 1944), Georgian statistician
A brand name of Estradiol valerate